Uladzimir Mihailavich Karytska (Vladimir Mikhailovich Korytko; born 6 July 1979) is a Belarusian football coach and a former player. He is currently the head coach of Belarus U20.

Career
Karytska has become a member of the Belarusian national side in 2002. Karytska did not receive call-ups during most of Bernd Stange's tenure as manager of the Belarus national side, but was nominated for a February 2012 friendly match against Moldova by new head coach Georgi Kondratiev, during which he earned his 40th cap.

International goals

References

External links

Stats on Odessa Football page

1979 births
Living people
People from Maladzyechna
Belarusian footballers
Association football midfielders
Belarus international footballers
Belarusian expatriate footballers
Expatriate footballers in Slovakia
Expatriate footballers in Russia
Expatriate footballers in Ukraine
Belarusian expatriate sportspeople in Ukraine
Belarusian expatriate sportspeople in Slovakia
Belarusian expatriate sportspeople in Russia
Russian Premier League players
Ukrainian Premier League players
Slovak Super Liga players
FC Molodechno players
FC Chist players
FC Torpedo Minsk players
FC Slavia Mozyr players
MFK Ružomberok players
FC Rostov players
FC Saturn Ramenskoye players
FC Moscow players
FC Spartak Vladikavkaz players
FC Akhmat Grozny players
FC Metalurh Zaporizhzhia players
FC Chornomorets Odesa players
FC Metalurh Donetsk players
FC Shinnik Yaroslavl players
FC Dynamo Bryansk players
FC Arsenal Tula players
FC Dinamo Minsk players
Ukrainian Cup top scorers
Sportspeople from Minsk Region